Cessnock High School is a government-funded co-educational comprehensive secondary day school, located in Aberdare, in the Hunter Region of New South Wales, Australia.

The school provides the school certificate in Year 10 and the NSW Higher School Certificate (HSC) in Year 12.

The school enrolled approximately 636 students in 2020, from Year 7 to Year 12, of whom 25 percent identified as Indigenous Australians and two percent were from a language background other than English. The school is operated by the NSW Department of Education; the principal is Peter Riley.

The school is part of the Cessnock Community of Great Public Schools, a local management group consisting of 15 schools designed to improve learning, engagement and wellbeing in the region.

History 
The school originally opened in 1921 at the location of the current Cessnock Public School. The high school was moved to its current site, on Aberdare Road, in May 1938. Around the time of its relocation, it was the biggest school in the state, and one of the biggest schools in Australia. During World War II, slip trenches were dug out at the school.

The school celebrated 75 years in 2013.

Notable alumni
Douglas Daft – businessman
Robert Endean - marine scientist and academic
Eric Fitzgibbon – politician
John Hughes - writer
Kenneth Neate - opera singer
Frank Rickwood - businessman

See also 

 List of government schools in New South Wales
 List of schools in the Hunter and Central Coast
 Education in Australia

References

External links
 
 NSW Schools website

Public high schools in New South Wales
City of Cessnock
Educational institutions established in 1938
1938 establishments in Australia